Infestation is a first-person action-adventure game released in 1990. The game was published by Psygnosis and released for the Amiga, Atari ST, and DOS. Based on a science fiction scenario inspired in part by the films Alien and Aliens, the player must rid a planetoid of insectoid alien life forms.

References

External links
Infestation at Lemon Amiga

1990 video games
Amiga games
Atari ST games
DOS games
FM Towns games
Video games about extraterrestrial life
Video games about insects
Science fiction video games
Psygnosis games
First-person adventure games
Video games developed in the United Kingdom
Single-player video games